The Buckner Cabin, also known as William Buzzard's Cabin, located about  northwest of Stehekin, Washington in Lake Chelan National Recreation Area of North Cascades National Park Complex, is one of a group of structures relating to the theme of early settlement in the Lake Chelan area. The original cabin, listed individually as the Buckner Cabin on the National Register of Historic Places, was built in 1889 by Willam Buzzard and altered in 1911 by William and Harry Buckner. The surrounding structures are included in the Buckner Homestead Historic District.

The cabin has been added to the National Register of Historic Placesin 1974 and has been included in the Buckner Homestead Historic District in 1989.

References

Houses on the National Register of Historic Places in Washington (state)
Buildings and structures in Stehekin, Washington
Houses in Chelan County, Washington
National Register of Historic Places in Chelan County, Washington
Houses completed in 1889
Individually listed contributing properties to historic districts on the National Register in Washington (state)